This is a list of people who have served as Custos Rotulorum of Suffolk.

 Sir Humphrey Wingfield bef. 1544–1545
 John Gosnold bef. 1547–1554
 Sir William Cordell bef. 1558 – bef. 1562
 Sir Clement Heigham bef. 1562–1571
 James Rivett bef. 1573 – aft. 1584
 Sir Robert Jermyn bef. 1594 – 1614
 Thomas Howard, 1st Earl of Suffolk bef. 1621–1624?
 Theophilus Howard, 2nd Earl of Suffolk 1624–1640
 James Howard, 3rd Earl of Suffolk 1640–1681
For later custodes rotulorum, see Lord Lieutenant of Suffolk.

References

Institute of Historical Research - Custodes Rotulorum 1544-1646
Institute of Historical Research - Custodes Rotulorum 1660-1828

Suffolk